Anisul Islam Mondal (born 25 August 1966) is a Jatiya Party (Ershad) politician and a former Jatiya Sangsad member representing the Rangpur-2 constituency.

Career
Mondal was elected to parliament from Rangpur-2 as a Jatiya Party candidate in 2008.

References

Living people
1966 births
People from Rangpur District
Jatiya Party politicians
9th Jatiya Sangsad members